Kevin Lee Robinson (born December 19, 1984) is a former professional gridiron football wide receiver. He was drafted by the Kansas City Chiefs in the sixth round of the 2008 NFL Draft. He played college football at Utah State. He signed with the Hamilton Tiger-Cats on October 15, 2009.

His brother was Green Bay Packers assistant coach John Rushing.

References

External links
Just Sports Stats
Hamilton Tiger-Cats bio
Kansas City Chiefs bio
Utah State Aggies bio

1984 births
Living people
Players of American football from California
American football wide receivers
Canadian football wide receivers
African-American players of American football
African-American players of Canadian football
Utah State Aggies football players
Kansas City Chiefs players
Hamilton Tiger-Cats players
Sportspeople from Fresno, California
21st-century African-American sportspeople
20th-century African-American people